Hristo Silyanov (1880 in Istanbul,  Ottoman Empire – 1939 in Sofia, Bulgaria) was a Bulgarian revolutionary, historian and memoirist. He was among the activists of the Bulgarian Macedonian-Adrianople Revolutionary Committees and in his memoirs uniquely described  the history of the organization in its early period.

Silyanov was born in a rich family in Constantinople. His father was a Bulgarian from Ohrid, Macedonia, and his mother was Greek. He studied in Istanbul and Thessaloniki, but graduated from the Bulgarian school in Bitola. Later Silyanov worked as the Bulgarian Exarchate's teacher in various towns in Ottoman Macedonia. After his participation in the Internal Macedonian-Adrianople Revolutionary Organization (IMARO), he joined the cheta lead by Marko Lerinski. As result of a severe illness in 1902, Silyanov moved to Sofia for treatment and from there criticized sharply the decision made by IMARO's Central Committee in Thessaloniki concerning the Ilinden–Preobrazhenie Uprising. However, in 1903 he was elected secretary of the Preobrazhenie Uprising committee in a session near Malko Tarnovo. During the Uprising he was a member of Mihail Gerdzhikov's cheta and participated in the battles in Strandzha for the taking of Vasiliko and Ahtopol.

After the Uprising, he graduated in history from Sofia University and afterwards specialized in Switzerland. In 1908 Siljanov was elected to the leading body of IMARO and made unsuccessful attempts to save the unity of the organization. During the Balkan Wars he was the leader of a cheta in Southern Macedonia and supported the Greek and later the Bulgarian Army during their invasions. During the First World War, he was imprisoned in Sofia as a Russophile, when Bulgaria was fighting against Russia. After the wars he settled in Sofia and worked there as a writer, publicist and journalist. Later he also became a politician and a member of the Macedonian Scientific Institute. His son Evgeny Silyanov was a prominent Bulgarian diplomat.

Silyanov Peak in Antarctica is named after Hristo Silyanov.

References

Sources
 Освободителните борби на Македония, том I, София, 1933
 Освободителните борби на Македония, том II, София 1943
 Писма и изповеди на един четник - Спомени от Странджа - От Витоша до Грамос
 "Към историята на Гръцката Терористическа Пропаганда в Македония" Hristo Silyanov on the history of the Greek terrorist propaganda in Macedonia. Published in Istanbul in 1909 (In Bulgarian).

1880 births
1939 deaths
Politicians from Istanbul
Bulgarians in Istanbul
Bulgarian educators
20th-century Bulgarian historians
Sofia University alumni
Bulgarian military personnel of the Balkan Wars
Members of the Internal Macedonian Revolutionary Organization
Members of the Macedonian Scientific Institute
Bulgarian revolutionaries
Macedonian Bulgarians